Beverston is a village and civil parish in the Cotswold district of Gloucestershire, England. According to the 2001 census it had a population of 132, decreasing to 129 at the 2011 census. The village is about two miles west of Tetbury. Beverston (also spelled Beverstone) is an example of a typical unaltered Gloucestershire Cotswold village. It is home to Beverston Castle dating to the 12th Century, a Norman Church St Mary's Church, Beverston, and some examples of Cotswold architecture.

See also
RAF Babdown Farm

References

External links

Villages in Gloucestershire
Cotswold District